Kayseri is a large industrialised city in Central Anatolia, Turkey, and the capital of Kayseri province. Historically known as Caesarea, it has been the historical capital of Cappadocia since ancient times. The Kayseri Metropolitan Municipality area is composed of five districts: the two central districts of Kocasinan and Melikgazi, and since 2004, also outlying Hacılar, İncesu and Talas.

As of 31 December 2021, the province had a population of 1,434,357 of whom 1,175,886 live in the  four urban districts, excluding İncesu which is not conurbated (i.e. not contiguous, having a largely non-protected buffer zone).

It contains a number of historic monuments, particularly from the Seljuk period. Tourists often pass through Kayseri en route to the  attractions of Cappadocia to the west.  

Kayseri is served by Erkilet International Airport and is home to Erciyes University.

Etymology 
Kayseri was originally called Mazaka or Mazaca (according to Armenian tradition, it was founded by and named after Mishak) and was known as such to the geographer Strabo, during whose time it was the capital of the Roman province of Cappadocia, known also as Eusebia at the Argaeus ( in Greek), after Ariarathes V Eusebes, King of Cappadocia (163–130 BC).

In 14 AD its name was changed by Archelaus (d. 17 AD), the last King of Cappadocia (36 BC–14 AD) and a Roman vassal, to "Caesarea in Cappadocia" (to distinguish it from other cities with the name Caesarea in the Roman Empire) in honour of Caesar Augustus upon his death. (Note that letter C in classical Latin was pronounced K. When the first Turks arrived in the region in 1080 AD, they adapted this pronunciation, which eventually became Kayseri in Turkish, remaining as such ever since.)

History

Kayseri experienced three golden ages. The first, dating to 2000 BC, was when the city formed a trade post between the Assyrians and the Hittites. The second came under Roman rule (1st to 11th centuries). The third golden age was during the reign of the Seljuks (1178–1243), when the city was the second capital of the Seljuk Sultanate of Rum. The relatively short Seljuk period left a large number of historic landmarks including the Hunat Hatun Complex, the Kiliç Arslan Mosque, the Ulu Camii (Grand Mosque) and the Gevher Nesibe Hastanesi (Hospital).

Ancient history
As Mazaca, the city served as the residence of the kings of Cappadocia. In ancient times, it was on the crossroads of the trade routes from Sinope to the Euphrates and from the Persian Royal Road that extended from Sardis to Susa during the 200+ years of Achaemenid Persian rule. In Roman times, a similar route from Ephesus to the East also crossed the city.

St Basil, one of the Cappadocian Fathers, established a large monastic complex, the Basileiad, in Caesarea Mazaca in the 4th century. Nothing remains of it today. 

The city stood on a low spur on the north side of Mount Erciyes (Mount Argaeus in ancient times). Very few traces of the ancient site now survive.

For more on the Roman and Byzantine eras see Caesarea (Mazaca).

Islamic era

The Arab general (and later the first Umayyad Caliph) Muawiyah invaded Cappadocia and took Caesarea from the Byzantines temporarily in 647. The city was called Kaisariyah by the Arabs, and later Kayseri by the Seljuk Turks after it was captured by Alp Arslan in 1067. Alp Arslan's forces demolished the city and massacred its population.  The shrine of Saint Basil was also sacked after the fall of the city. As a result, the city remained uninhabited for the next half century. 

From 1074–1178 the area was under the control of the Danishmendids who rebuilt the city in 1134. The Anatolian Seljuk Sultanate controlled the city from 1178 to 1243 and it was one of their most important centres until it fell to the Mongols in 1243. Within the walls lies the greater part of Kayseri, rebuilt between the 13th and 16th centuries. The city then fell to the Eretnids before finally becoming Ottoman in 1515. It was the centre of a sanjak called initially the Rum Eyalet (1515–1521) and then the Angora vilayet (founded as Bozok Eyalet, 1839–1923).

Modern era

The Grand Bazaar dates from the latter part of the 1800s, but the adjacent caravanserai (where merchant traders gathered before forming a caravan) dates from around 1500. The town's older districts (which were filled with ornate mansion-houses mostly dating from the 18th and 19th centuries) were subjected to wholesale demolition starting in the 1970s.

The building that hosted the Kayseri Lyceum was rearranged to host the Turkish Grand National Assembly during the Turkish War of Independence when the Greek army was advancing on Ankara, the base of the Turkish National Movement.

Geography

Climate 
Kayseri has a cold semi-arid climate in the Köppen climate classification (BSk), or a temperate continental climate in the Trewartha climate classification (Dc). It experiences cold, snowy winters and hot, dry summers with cool nights. Precipitation occurs throughout the year, albeit with a marked decrease in late summer and early fall.

Political structure

The city of Kayseri consists of sixteen metropolitan districts: Akkışla, Bünyan, Develi, Felâhiye, Hacılar, İncesu, Kocasinan, Melikgâzi, Özvatan, Pınarbaşı, Sarıoğlan, Sarız, Talas, Tomarza, Yahyâlı, and Yeşilhisar.

Local Attractions

In Kayseri 
 Republic Square
 Kayseri Castle
 Kayseri Clock Tower
 Bürüngüz Mosque
 Hunat Mosque
 Kayseri Bazaar (Kapali Carsi)
 Forum Kayseri
 Surp Asdvadzadzin Virgin Mary Church Research Library (Surp Asdvadzadzin Meryem Ana Kilisesi Araştırma Kütüphanesi)
 Ataturk House Museum
 The National Struggle Museum

Inside the centre of Kayseri the most unmissable reminder of the past are the huge basalt walls that once enclosed the old city. Dating back to the sixth century and the reign of the Emperor Justinian, they have been repeatedly repaired, by the Seljuks, by the Ottomans and more recently by the current Turkish government.In 2019 Kayseri Archaeology Museum moved from an outlying location to a new site inside the walls.

The Grand Mosque (Ulu Cami) was started by the Danişmend emir Melik Mehmed Gazi who is buried beside it although it was only completed by the Seljuks after his death.

There are many magnificent reminders of the Seljuk supremacy in and around the walls as well as many much smaller kümbets (domed tombs) of which the most impressive is the Döner Kümbet (Revolving Tomb). The oldest surviving Seljuk place of worship - and the oldest Seljuk mosque built in Turkey - is the Hunat Hatun Mosque complex which still includes a functioning hamam with separate sections for men and women dating back to 1238.

Near the mosque is the Sahabiye Medresesi, a theological school dating back to 1267 with a magnificent portal typical of Seljuk architecture.Very similar is the Avgunlu (Havuzlu) Medresesi which now serves as a large bookshop-cum-cafe in a park.

In Mimar Sinan Park stands the Çifte Medresesi, a pair of Seljuk-era theological schools that eventually served as a hospital for those with psychiatric disorders. They were commissioned by the Seljuk sultan Giyasettin I Keyhüsrev and his sister, Gevher Nesibe Sultan, who is buried inside. Today the buildings house the Museum of Seljuk Civilisations.

Another Seljuk survivor is the grand Halikılıç Mosque complex which has two spectacular entrance portals. It dates back to 1249 but was extensively restored  three centuries later. 

Post-dating the Seljuks is the Güpgüpoğlu Mansion which dates back to the early 15th century but is open to the public with the furnishings it would have had in the late 19th century when it was home to the poet and politician Ahmed Midhad Güpgüpoğlu. 

Close to the walls is Kayseri's own Kapalı Çarşı (Covered Market), still a bustling commercial centre selling cheap clothes, shoes and much else. Deep inside it is the older and very atmospheric Vezir Han which was commissioned in the early 18th century by Nevşehir-born Damad İbrahim Paşa who became a grand vizier to Sultan Ahmed III before being assassinated in 1730.

Around Kayseri 
The Kayseri suburb of Talas was the ancestral home of Calouste Gulbenkian, Aristotle Onassis and Elia Kazan. Once ruinous following the expulsion of its Armenian population in 1915 and then of its Greek population in 1923, it was largely reconstructed in the early 21st century. The Greek Orthodox Church of St Mary, built in 1888, has been converted into the Yaman Dede Mosque. Similarly attractive is the suburb of Germir, home to three 19th-century churches and many fine old stone houses.

Mount Erciyes (Erciyes Dağı) looms over Kayseri and serves as a trekking and alpinism centre. During the 2010s an erstwhile small, local ski resort was developed into more of an international attraction with big-name hotels and facilities suitable for all sorts of winter pastimes. 

The archaeological site of Kanesh-Kültepe, one of the oldest cities in Asia Minor, is 20 km northeast of Kayseri.

Ağırnas, a small town with many lovely old houses, was the birthplace in 1490 of the great Ottoman architect Mimar Sinan, and a house traditionally associated with him is open to the public as a museum. Beneath it there is one of the 'underground cities' so typical of Cappadocia. The restored church of St Prokopius dates back to 1857 and serves as a cultural centre. 

The small town of Develi also contains some attractive old houses. The 19th-century Armenian Church of St Mary has been turned into the Aşağı Everek Cami (Lower Everek Mosque).

Economy

Kayseri received notable public investments in the 1920s and 1930s. Sumer Textiles and Kayseri Tayyare Fabrikasi (an aeroplane manufacturer) were set up here in the post -Republican Era with the help of German and particularly Russian experts. The latter manufactured the first aircraft "made in Turkey" in the 1940s. After the 1950s, the city suffered from a decrease in the amount of public investment. It was, however, during the same years that Kayseri businessmen and merchants transformed themselves into rural capitalists. Members of families such as Sabancı, Has, Dedeman, Hattat, Kurmel, Özyeğin, Karamanlargil and Özilhan started out as small-scale merchants in Kayseri before becoming prominent actors in the Turkish economy. Despite setting up their headquarters in cities such as Istanbul and Adana, they often returned to Kayseri to invest.

Thanks to the economic liberalisation policies introduced in the 1980s, a new wave of merchants and industrialists from Kayseri joined their predecessors. Most of these new industrialists choose Kayseri as a base of their operations. As a consequence of better infrastructure, the city has achieved remarkable industrial growth since 2000, causing it to be described as one of Turkey's Anatolian Tigers.

The pace of growth of the city was so fast that in 2004 the city applied to the Guinness Book of World Records for the most new manufacturing industries started in a single day: 139 factories. Kayseri also has emerged as one of the most successful furniture-making hub in Turkey earned more than a billion dollars in export revenues in 2007. Its environment is regarded as especially favourable for small and medium enterprises.

The Kayseri Free Zone established in 1998 now has more than 43 companies with an investment of 140 million dollars. The Zone's main business activities include production, trading, warehouse management, mounting and demounting, assembly-disassembly, merchandising, maintenance and repair, engineering workshops, office and workplace rental, packing-repacking, banking and insurance, leasing, labelling and exhibition facilities. Kayseri FTZ is one of the cheapest land free zones in the world.

Some social scientists traced this economic success to a modernist Islamic outlook referred to as "Islamic Calvinism" which they said had taken root in Kayseri.

Transport

The city is served by Erkilet International Airport (ASR) which is a short distance from the centre of Kayseri. It offers several flights a day to Istanbul.

Kayseri is connected to the rest of country by rail services. There are four trains a day to Ankara. To the east there are two train routes, one to Kars and the other to Tatvan at the western end of Lake Van.

As the city is located in central Turkey, road transportation is very efficient. It takes approximately three hours to reach Ankara, the same to the Mediterranean coast and 45 minutes to Cappadocia. A notable ski resort in winter and accessible for trekking in summer, Mt Erciyes is only 30 minutes' drive from the city centre.

Within the city transportation largely relies on buses and private vehicles although there is also a light rail transit (LRT) system called Kayseray  which runs to the inter-city bus terminal and to Talas.

Sports

The city had two professional football teams competing in top-flight Turkish football. Kayserispor and Kayseri Erciyesspor simultaneously play in the Süper Lig, making Kayseri one of only two cities having more than one team in Spor Toto Süper Lig 2013–14 (the other being Istanbul). In 2006 Kayserispor became the only Turkish team to have won the UEFA Intertoto Cup. Kayserispor is the remaining professional team in the city, playing in the top flight as of 2023.

The Erciyes Ski Resort on Mount Erciyes is one of the largest ski resorts in Turkey.

The women's football club Kayseri Gençler Birliği was promoted to the Women's First League for the 2020-21 League season.

Sports venues
Kadir Has Stadium is a new generation stadium located in the outskirts of the city. Completed in early 2009, the all-seater stadium has a capacity of 33,000 spectators and is totally covered. It is shared by the two Kayseri football clubs. The stadium and surrounding sports complex are served by the light-rail system, Kayseray. The stadium was inaugurated with a Kayserispor – Fenerbahce league match. Kadir Has Stadium was one of eight host stadiums for the 2013 FIFA U-20 World Cup. It hosted the opening ceremony and the opening match between Cuba and the Republic of Korea.
Kadir Has Sports Arena is an indoor arena opened in 2008. It has seating capacity for 7,200 people. Together with Kadir Has Stadium, it is a part of the Kayseri Kadir Has Sports Complex, one of Turkey's most modern sports complexes. It was one of the venues for the 2010 FIBA World Championship.

Education

Kayseri High School (Kayseri Lisesi), founded in 1893, is one of Turkey's oldest high schools. Küçükçalık Anatolian High School (Nuh Mehmet Küçükçalık Anadolu Lisesi) was established in 1984 and provides education in English. Kılıçarslan is a private high school which became a sister school with Anatolia College in Thessaloniki in 2000. TED Kayseri College in the Kocasinan district is a private, non-profit, co-educational kindergarten, primary, junior high, and high school and the third largest school in the TED group; since its foundation in 1966 thousands of students have graduated from the school.

Kayseri is home to 3 state and 1 private universities.
Abdullah Gül University is the first state university in Turkey to have, as part of its constitution, legal provision for support by a foundation whose efforts are entirely dedicated to the work of the university.  It started enrolling students in 2013.
Erciyes University is the city's largest research university. Founded in 1978, it is a successor to schools founded in 1206 and 1956, and currently has 13 faculties, six colleges and seven vocational schools. The university employs more than 3100 academic and administrative personnel and enrols 41,225 students. 
Nuh Naci Yazgan University is a private university founded in 2009 with four faculties, two colleges and one vocational school.

 Kayseri University

Cuisine

Kayseri has several culinary specialities including mantı, pastırma and sucuk. Another speciality is stuffed zucchini flowers made with köfte, garlic and spices. Nevzine is a traditional dessert.

Image gallery

Notable people

Mimar Sinan (c. 1488/1490 – 1588), architect 
Kadi Burhan al-Din (1345–1398), Vizier and Atabeg of Eretnids
Gevher Nesibe (13th century), Princess of the Sultanate of Rum
Pavlos Karolidis (1849–1930), Greek historian and Member of the Ottoman Parliament
Khachatur Kesaratsi (1590–1646), Armenian archbishop of New Julfa, founder of the first printing press in Iran
Carrie Farnsworth Fowle (1854–1917), American missionary born in Kayseri
Mihran Kassabian (1870–1910), Armenian radiologist
Dikran Kelekian (1867–1951), Armenian art collector and dealer in Islamic art
Hagop Kevorkian (1872–1962), Armenian archaeologist and art collector
Abdullah Gül (1950– ), 11th President of Turkey

Twin towns – sister cities

Kayseri is twinned with:

 Homs, Syria
 Krefeld, Germany
 Maroua, Cameroon
 Miskolc, Hungary
 Mostar, Bosnia and Herzegovina
 Nalchik, Russia
 Pavlodar, Kazakhstan
 Saarbrücken (district), Germany
 Shusha, Azerbaijan
 Yongin, South Korea

See also

Anatolian Tigers

References

External links

Official Government Web Site
Kayseri and major sights in hundreds of pictures

 
Archaeological sites in Central Anatolia
Cappadocia
Cities in Turkey
Roman sites in Turkey
Districts of Kayseri Province